Mohamed Bouziane (born 23 April 1971) is an Algerian handball player. He competed in the men's tournament at the 1996 Summer Olympics.

References

External links
 

1971 births
Living people
Algerian male handball players
Olympic handball players of Algeria
Handball players at the 1996 Summer Olympics
Place of birth missing (living people)
21st-century Algerian people